Abdul Kader is a politician of Jessore District of Bangladesh and former member of parliament for Jessore-6 constituency in 1988.

Birth and early life 
Kader was born in Jessore district.

Career 
Abdul Kader is a lawyer. He was associated with the politics of the Jatiya Party. He was elected to parliament from Jessore-6 constituency in as an independent candidate in 1988 Bangladeshi general election. In the fifth parliamentary elections of 1991, he was defeated by the Jatiya Party.

References 

Living people
Year of birth missing (living people)
People from Jessore District
Jatiya Party (Ershad) politicians
4th Jatiya Sangsad members